The South African Railways Class 6B  of 1897 was a steam locomotive from the pre-Union era in the Cape of Good Hope.

In 1897 and 1898, the Cape Government Railways placed a third batch of 55 6th Class 4-6-0 steam locomotives in service, 32 on its Western System, 21 on its Midland System and two on its Eastern System. During the Second Boer War, seven were transferred to the Imperial Military Railways on loan, and in 1907 four were sold to the Benguela Railway in Angola. In 1912, when the remaining 51 locomotives were assimilated into the South African Railways, they were renumbered and designated Class 6B. During the Second World War, two of them were sold to the Sudan Railways.

Manufacturers
The original 6th Class  passenger steam locomotive was designed at the Salt River works of the Cape Government Railways (CGR) at the same time as the 7th Class, both according to the specifications of Michael Stephens, then Chief Locomotive Superintendent of the CGR, and under the supervision of H.M. Beatty, then Locomotive Superintendent of the Cape Western System.

The 55 locomotives in the third group were built between 1897 and 1898 by Dübs and Company and Neilson and Company. While they were being built, in 1898, the firm of Neilson and Company changed its name to Neilson, Reid and Company. Five of these locomotives were built by Dübs and of the remaining fifty, 37 were delivered as built by Neilson and the last thirteen as built by Neilson, Reid.

All five Dübs-built locomotives, numbered in the range from 577 to 581, and the thirteen Neilson, Reid-builts, numbered in the ranges from 587 to 593 and 595 to 600, went to the Midland System. Of the 37 Neilson-builts, 32 went to the Western System, numbered in the range from 202 to 233, three to the Midland System, numbered in the range from 582 to 584, and two to the Eastern System, numbered 663 and 664. Their respective works numbers and CGR engine numbers are tabled below.

These locomotives were, to all intents and purposes, identical to the previous fifty which became the Class 6A, except that they had four-axle Type XC1 tenders that rode on bogies instead of the three-axle Type YC tenders which were used with the earlier 6th Class locomotives.

Class 6 sub-classes
When the Union of South Africa was established on 31 May 1910, the three Colonial government railways (CGR, Natal Government Railways and Central South African Railways) were united under a single administration to control and administer the railways, ports and harbours of the Union. Although the South African Railways and Harbours came into existence in 1910, the actual classification and renumbering of all the rolling stock of the three constituent railways were only implemented with effect from 1 January 1912.

In 1912, all but four of these 55 locomotives were assimilated into the SAR, designated Class 6B and renumbered in the range from 490 to 540.

The rest of the CGR's 6th Class locomotives, together with those Classes 6-L1 to 6-L3 locomotives which were inherited by the Central South African Railways (CSAR) from the Oranje-Vrijstaat Gouwerment-Spoorwegen (OVGS) via the Imperial Military Railways (IMR), were grouped into thirteen more sub-classes by the SAR. The  locomotives became SAR Classes 6, 6A, 6C to 6H and 6J to 6L, the  locomotives became Class 6Y and the  locomotives became Class 6Z.

Modifications
Several of the CSAR's Classes 6-L1 to 6-L3 locomotives had been modified by P.A Hyde, Chief Mechanical Engineer (CME) of the CSAR, by having their round-topped fireboxes replaced with larger Belpaire fireboxes and by having larger, more sheltered cabs installed. This conversion improved their performance tremendously and resulted in several of the Classes 6, 6A and 6B locomotives being similarly modified by the SAR in later years, but without altering their classifications.
 
During the 1930s, many of them were modified once again when the CME of the SAR at the time, A.G. Watson, reboilered them with round-topped fireboxes again, but retaining the larger cabs. Once again, they retained their classifications.

Service

Imperial Military Railways
Seven of these locomotives saw service with the IMR during the Second Boer War, on loan from the CGR and temporarily renumbered for the duration of the war.

South African Railways
The 6th Class series of locomotives were introduced primarily as passenger locomotives, but when the class became displaced by larger and more powerful locomotive classes, it literally became a Jack-of-all-trades which proved itself as one of the most useful and successful locomotive classes ever to be designed at the Salt River shops. It went on to see service in all parts of the country, except Natal, and on all types of traffic.

Benguela Railway
In 1907, four of these locomotives were sold to the Benguela Railway (Caminho de Ferro de Benguela – CFB) in Angola. These, therefore, did not see SAR service. In the mid-1930s, to ease maintenance, modifications were made to the running boards and brake gear of the CFB locomotives. The former involved mounting the running boards higher, thereby getting rid of the coupled wheel fairings. This gave the locomotives a much more American rather than British appearance.

Sudan Railways
During the Second World War, sixteen of the Classes 6 to 6D were transferred to the Middle East to assist with the war effort during the North African Campaign. The two Class 6B locomotives in this group were numbers 534 and 538. They were sold to the Sudan Railways Corporation in 1942 and renumbered M711 and M712, in the same order as their former SAR engine numbers.

Renumberings
During their long service lives, some of the Class 6A locomotives underwent multiple renumbering. All were initially numbered into the CGR's three systems, in the number ranges from 202 to 233 on the Western System, 577 to 584, 587 to 593 and 595 to 600 on the Midland System, and 663 and 664 on the Eastern System. The seven locomotives which were loaned to the IMR were renumbered C502, C504 to C508 and C512 for the duration of their military service, while the four sold to Angola became the Benguela Railway's numbers 22 to 25.

On the four Benguela locomotives, sources are inconclusive about their renumbering sequence in respect of which particular CGR locomotive became which particular CFB locomotive. The numbers as listed were arrived at by a process of elimination.

In 1912, the remaining 51 locomotives were renumbered in the number range from 490 to 540 on the SAR. The table lists their renumbering, as well as their builders and works numbers.

Preservation
Four Class 6B locomotives are plinthed around South Africa.
 No. 490 is on display at the Old Railway Station Museum in Uitenhage.
 No. 498 is on display at Fort Klapperkop Museum in Pretoria.
 No. 500 is plinthed at the Vereeniging Station forecourt.
 No. 536 is on display near the entrance to the caravan park in Barberton.

Illustration
The main picture shows Neilson-built ex Western System 6th Class no. 206, later renumbered to SAR Class 6B no. 494 and reboilered with a Belpaire firebox, on the old Cape Town turntable. The locomotives in the following pictures all have round-topped fireboxes.

References

1330
1330
4-6-0 locomotives
2′C n2 locomotives
Steam locomotives of Sudan
Dübs locomotives
Neilson locomotives
Neilson Reid locomotives
Cape gauge railway locomotives
Railway locomotives introduced in 1897
1897 in South Africa
Passenger locomotives